My Name Is Pauli Murray is an 2021 American documentary film, directed by Betsy West and Julie Cohen, written by West, Cohen, Talleah Bridges McMahon and Cinque Northern. It follows the life of lawyer and activist Pauli Murray.

The film had its world premiere at the Sundance Film Festival on January 31, 2021. It was released in a limited release on September 17, 2021, prior to digital streaming on Prime Video on October 1, 2021, by Amazon Studios.

Synopsis
The film follows the life of lawyer and activist Pauli Murray who was instrumental in arguing the equal protection clause of the fourteenth amendment outlawed discrimination based on sex. Several scholars of Murray's work are featured in the film including Brittney Cooper and Rosalind Rosenberg. Rosenberg's research for the book Jane Crow: The Life of Pauli Murray is also highlighted. The film includes significant coverage of Murray's papers housed at the Schlesinger library. Murray's influence on Ruth Bader Ginsburg is covered in detail throughout the film.

Depiction of Murray's gender identity 
My Name Is Pauli Murray features a nuanced analysis of Murray's gender identity. The film makes extensive connections between Murray's gender identity and groundbreaking feminist legal arguments. Historian Rosalind Rosenberg explains in the film how a sense of "in-betweenness" contributed to the numerous innovative legal arguments presented by Murray with regards to race and gender.

Release
The film had its world premiere at the 2021 Sundance Film Festival on January 31, 2021. Shortly after, Amazon Studios acquired distribution rights to the film. It also screened at AFI Docs in June 2021. It was released in a limited release on September 17, 2021, prior to digital streaming on Amazon Prime Video on October 1, 2021.

Critical reception
Cohen has been quoted as noting Murray was an "unrecognized figure in so many areas" and an intent behind the creation of the film was to bring Murray's story to a wider audience. My Name Is Pauli Murray received positive reviews from film critics. It holds a 95% approval rating on review aggregator website Rotten Tomatoes, based on 20 reviews, with a weighted average of 7.80/10. The site's critics consensus reads: "My Name Is Pauli Murray educates and uplifts in equal measure while paying stirring tribute to a largely unsung -- yet hugely important -- individual."

Accolades
It won the prestigious Peabody Award in 2022.

References

External links
 
 
Official trailer

2021 films
2021 documentary films
American documentary films
American LGBT-related films
Biographical documentary films
Documentary films about LGBT topics
Documentary films about feminism
Documentary films about lawyers
Documentary films about misogyny
Participant (company) films
2021 LGBT-related films
Peabody Award-winning broadcasts
2020s English-language films
Films directed by Julie Cohen and Betsy West
2020s American films